Luke Michael Gebbie (born November 7, 1996) is a Filipino Olympic swimmer.

Career
Gebbie competed in the 2019 FINA World Championships in South Korea. In the tournament held in Gwangju, Gebbie established a new Philippine national record in the 100-meter freestyle by finishing with a time of 49.94 seconds. He is also the first Filipino to surpass the 50-seconds mark in the event.

He also participated in the 2019 Southeast Asian Games in the Philippines where he won a silver (men's 4x100 freestyle relay) and a bronze (men's 50 meter freestyle) for the host country. He also set new national records; In the men's 50 meter freestyle (22.57 seconds) and the men's 50m butterfly (24.34 seconds) events. The previous national men's 50m butterfly record was previously held by Daniel Coakley.

Based in Melbourne, Gebbie also participated in the 2021 Swimming Australia Olympic trials through a special exemption granted by Swimming Australia.

Gebbie qualified for the 2020 Summer Olympics in Tokyo through a universality invitation after he garnered enough FINA points from competing in various Olympic qualifying tournaments.

He was due to compete at the 2021 Southeast Asian Games in Vietnam in May 2022 but was unable to after he tested positive for COVID-19.

References

Filipino male swimmers
Living people
1996 births
Competitors at the 2019 Southeast Asian Games
Southeast Asian Games silver medalists for the Philippines
Southeast Asian Games bronze medalists for the Philippines
Southeast Asian Games medalists in swimming
Filipino male freestyle swimmers
Filipino male butterfly swimmers
Swimmers at the 2020 Summer Olympics
Olympic swimmers of the Philippines